Cham Surak, also rendered as Cham Surag, may refer to:
 Cham Surak-e Sofla
 Cham Surak-e Vosta